A three-part abrogative referendum was held in Italy on 3 June 1990, with two questions about hunting and one on health.

Turnout was low, with a 43% of the electors participating to the referendum. For the first time since the adoption of the Constitution in 1948, a referendum did not obtain the quorum, and all three were consequently declared null and void.

Hunting referendums
The hunting abrogative referendums concerned two issues:
a general limitation of legal hunting,
abolition of free access to open private fields for hunters.
These referendums were the first ones ever proposed by the Italian Greens. Although both referendums had a "yes" victory with more than 90% of votes, they were annulled according to the Italian Constitution which wants a 50% of turnout for a valid referendum.

Repealing the law restricting hunting

Repealing the law allowing hunting on private properties

Use of pesticides referendum
The third abrogative referendum concerned the right of the Italian Ministry of Health to establish limits for pesticides. The Greens said that these limits was decided upon reasons of political friendship rather than upon scientific bases. Even this referendum, despite its 90% of "yes" votes, was annulled for its low turnout.

References

Referendums in Italy
1990 referendums
1990 elections in Italy
Hunting in Italy
June 1990 events in Europe
Hunting referendums